Theodoros Kolokotronis Stadium, formerly known as Asteras Tripolis Stadium, is a football stadium in Tripoli, Greece. The stadium is the home stadium of Asteras Tripolis. The stadium holds 7,442 seats.  The stadium was renamed in honour of the hero of the Greek War of Independence, Theodoros Kolokotronis, on November 22, 2012.

External links
Asteras Tripolis Stadium Pics stadia.gr
 http://footballtripper.com/theodoros-kolokotronis-stadium-asteras-tripoli/

Football venues in Greece
Multi-purpose stadiums in Greece
Buildings and structures in Arcadia, Peloponnese
Tripoli, Greece
Asteras Tripolis F.C.
1979 establishments in Greece
Sports venues completed in 1979